Saint Jonas' Festival, also known as Rasos (Dew Holiday), Joninės, Kupolė, Midsummer Day or Saint John's Day) is a midsummer folk festival celebrated on 24 June all around Lithuania. While midsummer day is celebrated throughout Europe, many Lithuanians have a particularly lively agenda on this day. The traditions include singing songs and dancing until the sun sets, telling tales, searching to find the magic fern blossom at midnight, jumping over bonfires, greeting the rising midsummer sun and washing the face with a morning dew, young girls float flower wreaths on the water of river or lake. 

For thousands of years, Balts, the ancestors of the Lithuanians, have celebrated the summer solstice (Rasa to the Lithuanians) by offering sacrifices to the pagan gods, and priestesses light the altar fire. This tradition still continues to this day. The ritual is usually performed by members of Romuva (religion). 

When Christianity came to Lithuania, it brought with it the celebration of Saint John's Day and while Christians celebrate Joninės (St. John's) in the local language, Christians, Romuviai, and those with other beliefs all celebrate Rasos together. Lithuanians with the names Jonas, Jonė, Janina receive many greetings from their family, relatives and friends.

See also

 Kupolė
 Ivan Kupala Day
 Jāņi
 Jaaniõhtu
 Festa de São João do Porto

References
  Pagan rituals and meaning of Rasos

Festivals in Lithuania
Saint John's Day
Annual events in Lithuania
Summer events in Lithuania